Scincella reevesii (common name: Reeves's smooth skink) is a species of skink, a lizard in the family Scincidae. The species is endemic to Asia.

Etymology
The specific name, reevesii, is in honor of English naturalist John Reeves.

Geographic range
S. reevesii is found in southern China (Guangxi, Guangdong, Hainan, Hong Kong), Indochina (Thailand, Cambodia, Vietnam) and south to Western Malaysia, Myanmar, India, and Nepal. There is also a questionable record from Korea. Reports from Bangladesh represent Sphenomorphus maculatus.

Reproduction
S. reevesii is ovoviviparous.

References

Further reading
Bocourt MF (1878). "Note sur quelques Scincoidiens nouveaux ". Annales des Sciences Naturelles, Sixième Série [Sixth Series]  8 (16): 1–4. (Lygosoma nigropunctatum, new species, pp. 2–3). (in French).
Gray JE (1838). "Catalogue of the Slender-tongued Saurians, with Descriptions of many new Genera and Species". Ann. Mag. Nat. Hist., First Series 2 (10): 287–293. (Tiliqua reevesii, new species, pp. 292–293). 
Ouboter PE (1986). "A revision of the genus Scincella (Reptilia: Sauria: Scincidae) of Asia, with some notes on its evolution". Zoologische Verhandelingen (Leiden) 229: 1-66. PDF

Scincella
Reptiles of Cambodia
Reptiles of China
Reptiles of Hong Kong
Reptiles of India
Reptiles of Malaysia
Reptiles of Myanmar
Reptiles of Nepal
Reptiles of Thailand
Reptiles of Vietnam
Reptiles described in 1838
Taxa named by John Edward Gray